The 1995 Sam Houston State Bearkats football team represented Sam Houston State University as a member of the Southland Conference during the 1995 NCAA Division I-AA football season. Led by 14th-year head coach Ron Randleman, the Bearkats compiled an overall record of 5–5 with a mark of 2–3 in conference play, and finished tied for third in the Southland.

Schedule

References

Sam Houston State
Sam Houston Bearkats football seasons
Sam Houston State Bearkats football